Antanartia schaeneia, the long tail admiral or long-tailed admiral, is a butterfly of the family Nymphalidae. It is found in eastern Africa.

Both sexes are attracted to fermented fruit and males mud-puddle.

The larvae feed on Fleurya capensis, Boehmeria nivea, Australina, Boehmeria, Pouzolzia, and Urtica species.

Subspecies
Antanartia schaeneia schaeneia (Cape, Natal, Transvaal)
Antanartia schaeneia dubia (eastern Rhodesia to Malawi, Tanzania, Kenya, Uganda, Rwanda, eastern Zaire)
Antanartia schaeneia diluta (Ethiopia)

References

Butterflies described in 1879
Nymphalini
Taxa named by Roland Trimen
Butterflies of Africa